Priya A. S. is an Indian writer of Malayalam literature. She writes short stories, children's literature, translations and memoirs. She has translated Arundhati Roy's The God of Small Things into Malayalam under the title Kunju Karyangalude Odeythampuran of which Roy herself has said that although there have been translations in several languages, no other translation is as important to her as this, as it is the language of the novel's central characters. She is a three-time recipient of the Kerala Sahitya Akademi Award.

Biography 
Priya A. S. was born on May 28, 1967 at Eramalloor, near Cherthala, in Alappuzha district of the south Indian state of Kerala to a teacher couple, K. R. Sadashivan Nair and Anandavalli. 
She had a difficult childhood due to various diseases, and after schooling, she graduated in English literature from Maharaja's College, Ernakulam before securing a master's degree by private education. She has served at Mahatma Gandhi University and is a senior grade assistant at Cochin University of Science and Technology.

Priya is married to Unni and they have a son, Tanmoy alias Kunjunni.

Bibliography

Short story anthologies

Translations

Children's literature

 
 Kathakatha Painkili

Memoirs

Awards
Manjamarangal Chuttilum, a short story anthology, fetched Priya her first major award, Lalithambika Anterjanam Award for the best young woman writer in 2003. Kerala Sahitya Akademi selected Jagarooka, another of her short story anthology, for their annual award for story in 2004 and a decade later, the Sahitya Akademi honoured her with the 2014 Sahitya Akademi Translation Prize for Kunju Karyangalude Odeythampuran, the translation of The God of Small Things; in between she received the Siddhartha Literary Award in 2012 for her work for children, Ammem Kunjunneem Kunjunneem Ammem. She received the Kerala Sahitya Akademi Award for Children's Literature twice, in 2006 for her collection Chithrasalabhangalude Veedu, and in 2010 for her collection Perumazhayathe Kunjithalukal. She has won a host of other honours such as State Bank of India Literary Award, V. K. Unnikrishnan Award for Translation, Grihalakshmi Award, Ankanam Sahitya Award and Ramu Kariat Award.

See also 

 List of Malayalam-language authors by category
 List of Malayalam-language authors

References

Further reading

External links

 
 
 

Living people
People from Alappuzha district
Malayalam-language writers
Malayalam short story writers
Writers from Kochi
20th-century Indian women writers
20th-century Indian novelists
Indian women short story writers
Translators to Malayalam
21st-century Indian translators
Recipients of the Kerala Sahitya Akademi Award
21st-century Indian short story writers
1967 births
21st-century Indian women writers
21st-century Indian novelists
Indian women children's writers
Indian children's writers
Women writers from Kerala
Indian women translators
20th-century Indian translators
Maharaja's College, Ernakulam alumni
Recipients of the Sahitya Akademi Prize for Translation